The Bayer designations e Velorum and E Velorum are distinct. Due to technical limitations, both designations link here. For the star
e Velorum, see HD 73634
E Velorum, see HV Velorum (HD 73340)

Velorum, e
Vela (constellation)